Leptomyrmex nigriventris is a species of ant in the genus Leptomyrmex. Described by Félix Édouard Guérin-Méneville in 1831, the species is endemic to Australia.

References

Dolichoderinae
Hymenoptera of Australia
Insects described in 1831